Sin-hung Tam is a Chinese opera singer and actress from Hong Kong. Tam is credited with over 140 films.

Early life 
On August 28, 1931, Tam was born in Macau.

Career 
At age 13, Tam entered the entertainment business and started her career performing Cantonese opera. Tam studied under Yam Kim-fai. In 1953, Tam crossed over as an actress in Hong Kong films. Tam appeared in Sworn to Love, a 1953 comedy film directed by Chiang Wai-Kwong. Tam appeared in The Lion's Roar with both Yam Kim-fai and Pak Suet Sin, a 1959 Cantonese opera film directed by Chiang Wai-Kwong. In 1970, Tam retired from Cantonese film industry, but in 1987, she returned to acting. Tam is known for her role as Auntie Yung in A Kindred Spirit (1995-1999), a television drama series that was broadcast on TVB Jade in Hong Kong. Tam's last film was Textiles at Heart, a 2000 Romance film directed by Mak Kin-Bong. Tam is credited with over 140 films.

Filmography

Films 
This is a partial list of films.
 1953 Sworn to Love 
 1953 Woman in Grief 	 
 1954 Eighteen Marriages of a Smart Girl 
 1955 The Faithful Wife 
 1957 Wong Fei-Hung's Rebellion, Part 1 - villainess Daji.
 1958 Wong Fei-Hung's Rebellion (sequel)
 1959 The Lion's Roar 
 1963 The Young Boss of the Factory (aka Fun in the Factory) - spy.
 1965 The Six-fingered Lord of the Lute (Part 1) (aka The Ghost with Six Fingers)
 1967 Green-Eyed Demon 
 1967 The Three Swordsmen 
 1987 Seven Years Itch - Sylvia's mother 
 1995 Fatal Assignment  
 1995 Summer Snow - Ying Sun, Bing's mother 
 1996 Hu-Du-Men - Auntie Ming	
 1997 A Queer Story (1997)	 	 
 2000 Textiles at Heart - Wen's mother

Television 
 1995-1999 A Kindred Spirit - Auntie Yung

Personal life 
Tam's husband was Tak Keung Lam (died 2015).

References

External links 
 Tam Sin Hung at hkcinemagic.com
 Sin Hung Tam at douban.com
 Tam Sin Hung at rottentomatoes.com
 Tam Sin Hung at discogs.com
 Talking face to face with Cantonese opera stars
 Noble verses for a good cause at thestandard.com.hk

1931 births
Hong Kong Cantonese opera actresses
Hong Kong film actresses
Living people
Macau-born Hong Kong artists